Kendra Clarke (born November 16, 1996 in Edmonton, Alberta) is a Canadian track and field athlete competing in the sprint events, predominantly the 400m event.

In July 2016, she was officially named to Canada's Olympic team.

References

1996 births
Living people
Athletes from Edmonton
Canadian female sprinters
Athletes (track and field) at the 2016 Summer Olympics
Olympic track and field athletes of Canada
Black Canadian female track and field athletes
Olympic female sprinters